not to be confused with Albert Wolff (1814–1892).

Albert Moritz Wolff (15 June 1854, Berlin – 23 August 1923, Lüneburg) was a German sculptor and medallion-designer (medallist).

References

1854 births
1923 deaths
Artists from Berlin
German medallists
Französisches Gymnasium Berlin alumni
20th-century German sculptors
20th-century German male artists
19th-century German sculptors
German male sculptors
19th-century German male artists